Brogue may refer to:

Footwear
 Brogue boot, a type of dress boot
 Brogue shoe

Language
 Brogue (accent)
 Mission brogue, an accent spoken in the Mission District of San Francisco
 Ottawa Valley Brogue

Other
 Brogue (video game)
 Brogue, Pennsylvania
 Roslyn Brogue (1919–1981), American classical composer and educator